The Vakak Group (also spelled Wakak) is a small volcanic field located WSW of Kabul, Afghanistan.  It consists of 18 dacitic and trachytic volcanoes including lava domes and possibly an old caldera.

See also
 List of volcanoes in Afghanistan
 Lists of volcanoes

References

 

Volcanoes of Afghanistan
Mountain ranges of Afghanistan
Pleistocene lava domes
Inactive volcanoes